is a 2017 French-Japanese co-production drama film  directed by Kohei Igarashi and Damien Manivel. The film was featured at a number of International Film Festivals during its release, including the Febiofest film festival in Prague 2018, the Sofia Film Festival  and the BUFF film Festival

Plot

A 6-year-old boy is awoken one night by his fisherman father heading to work. Finding it impossible to fall back to sleep, he draws a picture which he then slips into his satchel. On his way to school next morning, still drowsy, he wanders off the path and ends up lost in the snow. The boy gets on a train, ending up in a big city, and endeavours to find his way home.

Cast

Takara Kogawa as Little Boy
Keiki Kogawa as sister
Takashi Kogawa as Father 
Chisato Kogawa as Mother

Production 
The film was shot in location in Aomori, Japan, as a French-Japanese co-production. The film had no actual dialogue, with only the sounds of the actions of the main character.

Festivals and awards
The film featured at a number of festivals including:

 74th Venice International Film Festival in 2017.
 Febiofest Film Festival in Prague, 2018.
 Sofia International Film Festival 
 BUFF International Film Festival 
 San Sebastián International Film Festival
 São Paulo International Film Festival 2017
 Buenos Aires International Festival of Independent Cinema 2018.
 27th Busan International Film Festival in 2022
The film was nominated for a number of awards, winning one:

 Ghent International Film Festival 2017 - Nominated Best Film
 IBAFF International Film Festival 2018 - Nominated Best Feature Film
 San Sebastián International Film Festival 2017 - nominated Zabaltegi prize. 
 Tokyo Filmex 2017 - Winner Student prize, nominated Grand Prize.
 Venice Film Festival 2017 - Nominated Venice Horizons award

Awards and nominations

References

External links
 
The Night I Swam at Unifrance
 The Night I Swam at Venice Film Festival 

2017 films
French drama films
Japanese drama films
Films without speech
2010s Japanese films
2010s French films